Artyom Yevgenyevich Lopatkin (born 8 August 1975) is a former Russian professional football player. He also holds Ukrainian citizenship, although it is not in accordance to the laws of Ukraine to have two citizenships.

In 1999 he scored eight goals in the 1998-99 Ukrainian Cup for FC Stal Alchevsk and repeating the record for the most goals scored in the cup's season that was set by Vitaliy Parakhnevych.

External links
 

1975 births
Sportspeople from Ivanovo
Living people
Russian footballers
Dinaburg FC players
FC Dynamo Saky players
FC Stal Alchevsk players
Russian expatriate footballers
Expatriate footballers in Latvia
Expatriate footballers in Ukraine
Russian expatriate sportspeople in Latvia
Ukrainian Cup top scorers
Association football forwards
FC Lukhovitsy players
FC Sever Murmansk players
Ukrainian Premier League players
Ukrainian First League players
Ukrainian Second League players
FC Tekstilshchik Ivanovo players